The expression Co-ordinated Organisation refers to several international organisations that have a common system of remuneration and pensions, and who are members of the Co-ordination System.

List of Co-ordinated Organisations 
There are currently six members of the Co-ordinated Organisations. On 31 March 2010, the Western European Union was dissolved by the ten member countries and its competences were transferred to the European Union. EUMETSAT joined Co-ordination on 1 July 2012.
 The Council of Europe (CoE)
 The European Centre for Medium-Range Weather Forecasts (ECMWF)
 The European Space Agency (ESA)
 The European Organisation for the Exploitation of Meteorological Satellites (EUMETSAT)
 The North Atlantic Treaty Organization (NATO)
 The Organisation for Economic Co-operation and Development (OECD)
 The Western European Union (WEU) (Formerly a member of the Co-ordinated Organisations - Now defunct)

Role of Co-ordination 
The Co-ordinated Organisation system includes three different Committees:

 The Co-ordinating Committee on Remuneration (CCR),
 The Committee of Representatives of the Secretaries/ Directors General (CRSG),
 The Committee of Staff Representatives (CRP).

The three committees meet separately, as well as in bilateral and tripartite meetings.

The main role of the CCR is advisory and is to make recommendations on remuneration and pension-related matters to Councils of the Co-ordinated Organisations. Although all member countries of each organisation may participate in the Committee, many choose for different reasons not to do so.  Representatives generally come from the respective governments' Finance, Interior or Foreign Ministries, or from national delegations to one of the Co-ordinated Organisations (see below).

The CRSG is composed of the Heads of Administration of the different organisations or of their representatives in charge of remuneration matters. The CRSG prepares proposals and documents on remuneration and pensions for discussion in tripartite, bilateral or individual meetings of the committees.

The CRP includes staff of the different organisations and are represented at tripartite meetings with the CCR and the CRSG. The CRP has a consultative role.

The principal aim of the Co-ordination system is to provide recommendations on issues concerning salaries and allowances to the Governing bodies of the Co-ordinated Organisations, in order to remove separate detailed discussions on these issues from each of them, as well as from their budget committees. These recommendations concern particularly:

 Basic salary scales, and the method of their adjustment, for all categories of staff and for all member countries where there are active staff or recipients of a pension;
 Pension Scheme Rules;

They also provide recommendations concerning the function, amount and the method of adjustment of the:
 Expatriation allowance,
 Household allowance,
 Installation allowance,
 Dependant's allowance,
 Daily subsistence allowance,
 Kilometric allowance,
 Expatriated child allowance,
 Education allowance,
 Allowance for a handicapped child.
 
The Co-ordinated Organisations have technical support section based in Paris at the Organisation for Economic Co-operation and Development: the International Service for Remunerations and Pensions (ISRP).

The ISRP is responsible for the management and review of all matters pertaining to the remuneration of staff and the Pension Scheme common to the Co-ordinated Organisations. The Service is made up of four Units, whose functions revolve around four key activities:

 pensions administration;
 studies and analysis;
 the management of pension reserve funds; and
 overseeing the secretariat of the statutory consultation bodies of the Co-ordinated Organisations.

There are also 25 non co-ordinated international organisations employing over 13 000 staff members which either apply the Co-ordinated scales, or follow them closely.

Linguistic rules of the coordinated organisations 
Source: "Rapport d'Information déposé par la délégation de l'Assemblée Nationale pour l'Union Européenne sur la diversité linguistique", of Michel Herbillon, member of the French National Assembly.

Other non-member institutions that observe similar rules 
Around 25 "non-coordinated" international organisations follow the Co-ordinated scales or use them as a benchmark.

See also 

 United Nations System

Notes

References

External links 
 How Co-ordination Works

Council of Europe